Christophe Kalfayan (born 26 May 1969 in Antibes, Alpes-Maritimes) is a retired male freestyle swimmer from France, who represented his native country in three consecutive Summer Olympics, starting in 1988. He twice won the silver medal in the men's 50 m freestyle at the European LC Championships (50 m): in 1993 and 1995.

See also

 List of European Aquatics Championships medalists in swimming (men)

References

1969 births
Living people
People from Antibes
Olympic swimmers of France
French male freestyle swimmers
Swimmers at the 1988 Summer Olympics
Swimmers at the 1992 Summer Olympics
Swimmers at the 1996 Summer Olympics
European Aquatics Championships medalists in swimming
Mediterranean Games gold medalists for France
Swimmers at the 1991 Mediterranean Games
Swimmers at the 1993 Mediterranean Games
Mediterranean Games medalists in swimming
Sportspeople from Alpes-Maritimes
20th-century French people
21st-century French people